The Munster GAA Football Under-20 Championship, known simply as the Munster Under-20 Championship, is an annual inter-county Gaelic football competition organised by the Munster Council of the Gaelic Athletic Association (GAA). It is the highest inter-county football competition for male players between the ages of 17 and 20 in the province of Munster. The championship was contested as the Munster Under-21 Championship between 1962 and 2016 before changing to an under-20 age category from 2018. It is sponsored by EirGrid.

The final, currently held in March, serves as the culmination of a series of games played during a three-week period, and the results determine which team receives the Corn na Cásca. The championship has always been played on a straight knockout basis whereby once a team loses they are eliminated from the championship.

The Munster Championship is an integral part of the wider GAA Football Under-20 All-Ireland Championship. The winners of the Munster final, like their counterparts in the other three provinces, advance to the semi-final stage of the All-Ireland series of games.

Six teams currently participate in the Munster Championship. Kerry is the most successful team with 29 titles . The title has been won at least once by five teams, with just three of these winning the title more than once. Kerry are the current champions.

History

Creation

The Munster Championship began in 1962 in response to a motion put forward for the introduction of a new championship grade to bridge the gap between underage and adult levels. It was the fourth championship to be created after the senior, junior and minor.

Beginnings

The inaugural Munster Championship featured Clare, Cork, Kerry, Limerick, Tipperary and Waterford. Cork and Waterford contested the very first match on Sunday 22 July 1962. Kerry won the inaugural championship.

Team dominance

Cork and Kerry have dominated the championship since the very beginning. Their hegemony saw one of them claim every available title for nearly the first 50 years of the competition. Kerry dominated the first two decades by winning 11 titles in the first 17 seasons. The set records by becoming the first team to win three-in-a-row and surpass it by winning four-in-a-row. Cork became the pre-eminent team of the eighties by winning seven titles in ten years, including a record-equalling four-in-a-row. Kerry returned as the foremost team of the nineties, claiming all but one of the available titles in a ten-year spell and ending the decade by setting the all-time record of five successive championship victories. The Millennium year saw Limerick break the duopoly by claiming their first and only title, with Waterford and Tipperary also adding their names to the roll of honour. The 21st Century has seen Cork return as the dominant force by winning 12 titles in the first two decades.

Current format

Overview

The Munster Championship is a single elimination tournament. Each team is afforded only one defeat before being eliminated from the championship. Pairings for matches are drawn at random and there is currently no seeding. Each match is played as a single leg. If a match is drawn there is a period of extra time, however, if both sides are still level at the end of extra time a replay takes place and so on until a winner is found.

Progression

Qualification for subsequent competitions

The Munster Championship winners gain automatic entry to the semi-final stage of the All-Ireland Championship. Unlike, the hurling counterpart, there is no "back-door" for the runners-up.

Managers

Managers in the Munster Championship are involved in the day-to-day running of the team, including the training, team selection, and sourcing of players from the club championships. Their influence varies from county-to-county and is related to the individual county boards. The manager is assisted by a team of two or three selectors and an extensive backroom team consisting of various coaches. The under-20 team manager also works closely with the senior team manager due to an overlap of players on both teams. Prior to the development of the concept of a manager in the 1970s, teams were usually managed by a team of selectors with one member acting as chairman.

Top winners

List of finals

Recent finals

Records and statistics

Teams by decade
The most successful team of each decade, judged by number of Munster Championship titles, is as follows:

 1960s: 5 for Kerry (1962-64-66-67-68)
 1970s: 6 for Kerry (1972-73-75-76-77-78)
 1980s: 7 for Cork (1980-81-82-84-85-86-89)
 1990s: 9 for Kerry (1990-91-92-93-95-96-97-98-99)
 2000s: 6 for Cork (2001-04-05-06-07-09)
 2010s: 6 for Cork (2011-12-13-14-16-19)
 2020s: 2 for Kerry (2020-22)

References

 Under
Munster